The 1979 NASL Budweiser Indoor Soccer Invitational was a four-team indoor soccer tournament held at the Bayfront Center in St. Petersburg, Florida on the final weekend of January 1979.

Overview
Four teams North American Soccer League teams participated in the two-day event; the Dallas Tornado, the Fort Lauderdale Strikers, the Tampa Bay Rowdies, and the Tulsa Roughnecks. Matches were 45 minutes long and divided into three 15-minute periods with an intermission between each. Each session consisted of two games (i.e. a doubleheader). Nearly 12,700 people attended the two sessions. Dallas and Tampa Bay each won both of their matches, but Dallas Tornado were crowned champions based on a greater goal differential. Dallas forward Jim Ryan lead the invitational in scoring with 7 goals. The tournament's final match saw goalkeeper Winston DuBose of Tampa Bay become only the second NASL goalie to record a rare indoor shut-out. Dallas goalkeeper Ken Cooper had accomplished the feat on two previous occasions.

These were not the only indoor games played that winter. With a fully sanctioned season of NASL indoor soccer still eleven months away, NASL teams were free to schedule their own games at that time. Tampa Bay, for example played three other indoor matches. By contrast, Fort Lauderdale scheduled only the two games of the invitational. The competing Major Indoor Soccer League had already begun their first season in December 1978.

Tournament results

Sessions
Session 1: January 27, 1979
 

Session 2: January 28, 1979

Match reports

Session 1

Session 2

Final standings
GF = Goals For, GA = Goals Against, GD = Goal Differential

*Dallas wins title on goal differential

Statistical leaders

Scoring
Goals (worth 2 points), Assists (worth 1 point)

Goalkeeping
GA = Goals Against, GAA = Goals Against Average, SV = Saves, SF = Shots Faced, % = Save Percentage

Non-tournament matches
In addition to the tournament itself, several NASL teams participated in international indoor friendlies, and tune-ups for both the tournament and 1979 outdoor season. Dallas and Houston played twice in December 1978. The Rowdies–Hurricane match on January 25 was played using the MISL-size goals, timing and ball, as the arena was already set up for the Hurricane's alter ego, the MISL's Houston Summit. As part of a six-match, NASL tour in February, perennial Soviet powerhouse FC Dynamo Moscow scheduled three indoor games.

Match reports

See also 
North American Soccer League

References 

NASL Indoor seasons
indoor
1979 in American soccer
NASL Indoor Season, 1979
NASL Indoor invitational
Dallas Tornado matches
1979
Sports in St. Petersburg, Florida
Soccer in Florida